Sy Wexler (1916-2005) was an American filmmaker best known for the hundreds of educational short films he made, mostly during the 1960s and 1970s. The most famous was Squeak the Squirrel. He also co-produced a short film titled The Searching Eye (1964), which was directed by Saul Bass, and shown during the 1964 New York World's Fair.

External links
{www.syandhelenwexler.com}

Squeak the Squirrel at the Internet Archive
Obituary at the New York Times

1916 births
2005 deaths
Deaths from cancer in California